Port Elgin Airport  is located  southwest of Port Elgin, Ontario, Canada.

See also
 Port Elgin (Pryde Field) Airport

References

Registered aerodromes in Ontario